Więckowice may refer to the following places:
Więckowice, Kraków County in Lesser Poland Voivodeship (south Poland)
Więckowice, Proszowice County in Lesser Poland Voivodeship (south Poland)
Więckowice, Tarnów County in Lesser Poland Voivodeship (south Poland)
Więckowice, Subcarpathian Voivodeship (south-east Poland)
Więckowice, Greater Poland Voivodeship (west-central Poland)
Więckowice, Podkarpackie Voivodeship